Kahnan-e Sarney (also Romanized as Kahnān-e Sarney, Kahanān Sarney, Kahnān-e Sarnī, and Kahnān-e Sorney) is a village in Tukahur Rural District, Tukahur District, Minab County, Hormozgan Province, Iran. At the 2006 census, its population was 1,144, in 263 families.

References 

Populated places in Minab County